The 1997–98 Allied Dunbar Premiership Two was the eleventh full season of rugby union within the second tier of the English league system, currently known as the RFU Championship. New teams to the division included West Hartlepoool and Orrell who had been relegated from the Courage Premiership 1996-97 while Exeter and Fylde were promoted from National League 1. For the first time Premiership Two, along with the Premiership, was sponsored by the assurance company Allied Dunbar. For the previous ten seasons the league was known as the Courage Clubs Championship and sponsored by Courage Brewery.

Bedford, the champions, were promoted to the Allied Dunbar Premiership for season 1998–99, along with runner-up West Hartlepool. From next season, the top two divisions would consist of fourteen teams, an increase of two per division. The bottom two teams in the top tier played the third and fourth teams in Premiership Two for the final two places in the top division. Third place London Scottish won promotion by beating Bristol in a two legged play-off, while fourth placed Rotherham lost to London Irish. There was no relegation to Jewson National League 1 because of the increase in teams in the top two divisions.

Participating teams

Final table

Results

Round 1

Round 2

 match postponed and rescheduled to 25 April 1998.

 match postponed and rescheduled to 2 May 1998.

 match postponed and rescheduled to 18 April 1998.

Round 3

Round 4

Round 5

Round 6

Round 7

Round 8

Round 9

Round 10

Round 11

Round 12

Round 13

 postponed, match rescheduled to 24 January 1998.

 postponed, match rescheduled to 24 January 1998.

 postponed, match rescheduled to 18 April 1998.

 postponed, match rescheduled to 11 April 1998.

Rescheduled match

Round 14

Round 13 (rescheduled matches)

Round 15

Round 16

Rescheduled match

Rescheduled matches

Round 17

 postponed, match rescheduled to 4 April 1998.

Round 18

Round 19

Round 17 (rescheduled match)

Round 20 (including postponed match from round 13)

 postponed, match rescheduled to 22 April 1998.

 match rescheduled from round 13.

Round 21 (including postponed matches from rounds 2 & 13)

 match rescheduled from round 2.

 match rescheduled from round 13.

Round 20 (rescheduled match)

Round 22

Round 2 (rescheduled match)

Individual statistics
 Note that points scorers includes tries as well as conversions, penalties and drop goals.

Top points scorers

Top try scorers

Season records

Team
Largest home win — 74 pts
77 – 3 Bedford at home to Coventry on 8 November 1997
Largest away win — 60 pts
67 – 7 Bedford away to Fylde on 27 December 1997
Most points scored — 151 pts
77 – 3 Bedford at home to Coventry on 8 November 1997
Most tries in a match — 11
Bedford Blues at home to Coventry on 8 November 1997
Most conversions in a match — 8 (x3)
Bedford at home to Coventry on 8 November 1997
Bedford away to Fylde on 27 December 1997
West Hartlepool at home to Fylde on 14 February 1998
Most penalties in a match — 6 (x9)
N/A - multiple teams
Most drop goals in a match — 2 (x4)
Exeter at home to Bedford on 13 September 1997
Moseley at home to Orrell on 25 October 1997
Coventry at home to West Hartlepool on 31 January 1998
Wakefield at home to Rotherham on 28 March 1998

Player
Most points in a match — 32
 Mike Rayer for Bedford at home to Coventry on 8 November 1997
Most tries in a match — 4 (x3)
 John Clarke for Blackheath at home to Fylde on 20 September 1997
 Jason Forster for Bedford at home to Fylde on 17 January 1998
 Ben Wade for Rotherham at home to Exeter on 25 April 1998
Most conversions in a match — 8 (x3)
 Mike Rayer for Bedford at home to Coventry on 8 November 1997
 Mike Rayer for Bedford away to Fylde on 27 December 1997
 Steven Vile for West Hartlepool at home to Fylde on 14 February 1998
Most penalties in a match —  6 (x9)
N/A - multiple players
Most drop goals in a match —  2 (x3)
 Meeku Patidar for Exeter at home to Bedford on 13 September 1997
 Matt Jones for Moseley at home to Orrell on 25 October 1997
 Greg Miller for Wakefield at home to Rotherham on 28 March 1998

Attendances
Note that attendances were very poorly documented this season and there is no information available

Highest — N/A
N/A
Lowest — N/A
N/A
Highest Average Attendance — N/A
N/A
Lowest Average Attendance — N/A
N/A

See also
 English rugby union system

References

1997–98 in English rugby union leagues
1997-98